Fluprazine (DU-27,716) is a drug of the phenylpiperazine class. It is a so-called serenic or antiaggressive agent. It is closely related to several other piperazines, including eltoprazine and batoprazine, and TFMPP, as well as more distantly to the azapirones such as buspirone. The pharmacology of fluprazine is unknown, but it is likely to act as an agonist at the 5-HT1A and 5-HT1B receptors like its sister compound eltoprazine.

See also 
 Phenylpiperazine

References 

meta-Trifluoromethylphenylpiperazines
Serotonin receptor agonists
Ureas